3WM is a radio station based in Horsham in the Wimmera Mallee region of Victoria, Australia. It broadcasts on the AM band, at a frequency of 1089 kHz, and on the FM band around Ararat at a frequency of 96.1 MHz.

The station is part of the Ace Radio network.

History
The station opened on 11 September 1933 as 3HS Horsham. On 16 May 1936 the station was taken over by 3DB a subsidiary of The Herald and Weekly Times, Melbourne. Then, on 24 December 1936, the call sign was changed to 3LK and, at this time, the Horsham studios and transmitter were closed with the transmitter being relocated to the small village of Lubeck, hence the 3LK call sign. (Lubeck currently has a population of about 140, but it would have been bigger when a few 3LK technicians lived there with their families and, importantly, when Lubeck was a railway junction for the branch line to Rupanyup).

3LK did not have a local Wimmera studio, and the vast majority of its programming was relayed from 3DB. There was, however, about one or two hours per day of local programming, which came from the 3LK studio in the 3DB Melbourne building, utilising 3DB announcing staff. 3LK supported numerous local Wimmera/Mallee events and charities.

The slogan used for all 3DB/3LK programming during most of this era was: 3DB Melbourne, 3LK Central Victoria, the Herald-Sun stations, but towards the end of the DB/LK partnership this was modified to the more logical: 3DB Melbourne, 3LK Wimmera Mallee, the Herald-Sun stations.

The Herald and Weekly Times sold 3LK on 1 February 1972 and its studios and transmitter were again moved to Horsham. In 1977 there was yet another name change when 3LK Horsham became 3WM Wimmera Mallee, broadcasting from Horsham.

In July 2022 the station began broadcasting on 96.1 MHz on the FM band in the Ararat district.

Current Programming
Currently, 3WM takes much of its programming from 3AW Melbourne.

3WM's sister station, also a member of the Ace Radio network, is Mixx FM Wimmera Mallee. Mixx FM broadcasts on three different channels from transmitters placed in geographically diverse parts of the Wimmera Mallee: 101.3 MHz from Horsham, 94.5 MHz from Lawloit (near Nhill) and 98.5 MHz from Ararat.

See also
3DB (Melbourne)

References

External links

Radio stations in Victoria
Classic hits radio stations in Australia
Ace Radio